Trischidium is a genus of flowering plants in the legume family, Fabaceae. It belongs to the subfamily Faboideae. It was recently reinstated after existing for some time as a junior synonym of Bocoa.

References

Swartzieae
Taxa named by Edmond Tulasne
Fabaceae genera